Mauripur Expressway is one of the important roads in the southern region of Karachi, which is mostly used for shipping equipment from the port. The road starts from the Merewether Clock Tower and ends at Sher Shah.

See also 
 Transport in Karachi
 Expressways of Pakistan

References

Transport in Karachi
Expressways in Karachi